Nicky Ladanowski is a Los Angeles-based English actress and writer working in television, film and theatre. 
She is known for various roles in an extensive film and television career including Merle Jackson in Coronation Street, Mandy Cutler in Paradise Heights and Mand in Grease Monkeys. She is often known for playing beautiful and glamorous characters such as Anne-Marie in Hollyoaks and loveable characters such as nurse Sarah in Death Becomes Him and Lisa Trotter in The Sarah Jane Adventures for the BBC. She is also famed for her many comedic roles in shows such as the BBC's My Family and with Ricky Gervais in Extras as Les Dennis's fiancé Simone Lewis. Having starred in all of the UK's medical drama's Doctors, Holby City and Casualty she has recently been seen in two of the UK's other primetime shows Law & Order: UK for ITV and Waterloo Road for the BBC.

Filmography

External links

 http://www.nickyladanowski.com
 https://twitter.com/NickyLadanowski
 https://www.instagram.com/nickyladanowski/

English television actresses
English stage actresses
British people of Polish descent
Living people
Year of birth missing (living people)